Over the Top: The Rarities is a compilation album by the band Motörhead, released in 2000 on the Sanctuary Records label. It features rare alternative recordings of several songs throughout the band's history.

Recording
Most of the included tracks are alternative versions of well-known early Motörhead songs such as "Capricorn," as well as two songs under new unofficial titles; "Lemmy Goes To The Pub" (alternate version of "Heart Of Stone") and "Same Old Song, I'm Gone" (alternative of "Remember Me, I'm Gone"). Also included is a collaboration with Girlschool, a recording of "Please Don't Touch" under the combined band name of Headgirl.

Track listing

All songs writing by Kilmister, Clarke, Taylor except where noted.

Personnel

Motörhead
 Lemmy Kilmister – Lead Vocals (All Songs Except Track 1), Bass (All Songs)
 "Fast" Eddie Clarke – Lead Guitar (Track 1 - 11), Backing Vocals (Track 1 - 11)
 Phil "Philthy Animal" Taylor – Drums (Track 1 - 3 & 6 - 12)
 Brian "Robbo" Robertson - Lead Guitar (Track 12)

Girlschool
 Kim McAuliffe - Rhythm Guitar (Track 4), Backing Vocals (Track 4)
 Kelly Johnson - Lead Guitar (Track 4), Lead Vocals (Track 4)
 Enid Williams - Bass (Track 4), Backing Vocals (Track 4)
 Denise Dufort - Drums (Track 4 - 5)

References

External links
Motörhead official website

Motörhead compilation albums
2000 compilation albums
Sanctuary Records compilation albums
Heavy metal compilation albums